Shabnam Qolikhani (born 9 November 1977) is an Iranian TV, and cinema actress.

Career 
Shabnam Qolikhani is an Iranian actress, director and acting coach. She started her career as an actor in 1997 by acting in Antigone and directed her first short film, Reality of a Street Seller, in 2004. She has written and directed several theatre and short films, including both documentary and feature films. She has been teaching in drama schools since 2004. She was a member of faculty in Tehran Azad University for several years, teaching principle of Acting and drama. She has Master of Art in Dramatic Art (theater directing) from Azad University, Tehran, Iran in 2003 and got her Bachelor of Art in Dramatic Arts (stage design) from Azad University, Tehran, Iran in 2000.

Filmography
source:

Television dramas

Films

Theater

Awards 
The Acknowledgment Board of the Artists' Islamic Association for playing the role of "Saint Mary”
The "Prominent Actress" Acknowledgment Sheet for playing of role of "Saint Mary", Jame-Jam World Network
Acknowledgment Sheet for playing of role of "Saint Mary", Awarded by CEO of IRIB (Islamic Republic of Iran Broadcasting)
The Best Actress's award, Golden Platform (a festival in Russia), 2005
Iranian Student Film Festival Jury Appreciation for the production of the short film "Lonely Me", April 2006
Certificate of Achievement from the 1st Iranian Consumption Optimization Film Festival, November 2010
The "Best Actress", Jame-Jam TV Network Audiences' Choice Award, January 2004
Certificate of Achievement from the 2nd Canada's Iranian Film Festival, September 2010
The Acknowledgment Board from the IRIB board of directorsfor playing in "Ladder to Sky", a TV series
The Acknowledgment Board from the IRIB III board of directorsfor playing in "Five Kilometers to Paradise", a TV series

References

External links

Shabnam Qolikhani On Instagram
Shabnam Qolikhani on SourehCinema  (in Persian)

1977 births
Living people
People from Tehran
Actresses from Tehran
Iranian screenwriters
Iranian film actresses
Iranian stage actresses
Iranian women film directors
Iranian television actresses
Islamic Azad University, Central Tehran Branch alumni
Academic staff of the Islamic Azad University, Central Tehran Branch